The Tupper Baronetcy, of Armdale, Halifax in Nova Scotia, Canada, is a title in the Baronetage of the United Kingdom. It was created on 13 September 1888 for the Canadian politician Charles Tupper. He was Canadian High Commissioner to the United Kingdom from 1883 to 1896 and Prime Minister of Canada in 1896.

Tupper baronets, of Armdale (1888)
Sir Charles Tupper, 1st Baronet (1821–1915)
Sir Charles Stewart Tupper, 2nd Baronet (1884–1960)
Sir Charles Tupper, 3rd Baronet (1880–1962)
Sir James Macdonald Tupper, 4th Baronet (1887–1967)
Sir Charles Hibbert Tupper, 5th Baronet (1930–2008)
Sir Charles Hibbert Tupper, 6th Baronet (born 1964)

The heir presumptive is Charles Reginald Hibbert Tupper (born 1947), a descendant of the 1st Baronet

Line of Succession

  Sir Charles Tupper of Armdale, 1st Baronet (1821–1915)
 James Stewart Tupper (1851–1915)
  Sir Charles Stewart Tupper, 2nd Baronet (1884–1960)
 Hon. Sir Charles Hibbert Tupper (1855–1927)
  Sir Charles Tupper, 3rd Baronet (1880–1962)
  Sir James Macdonald Tupper, 4th Baronet (1887–1967)
  Sir Charles Hibbert Tupper, 5th Baronet (1930–2008)
  Sir Charles Hibbert Tupper, 6th Baronet (born 1964)
 Reginald Hibbert Tupper (b. 1893)
 Charles Gordon Hibbert Tupper (b. 1918)
 (1) Charles Reginald Hibbert Tupper (b. 1947)
 (2) David Wilson Hibbert Tupper (b. 1921)
 (3) Sidney Victor Hibbert Tupper (b. 1948)
 (4) Charles Austin Hibbert Tupper (b. 1951)
 Hon. William Johnston Tupper (1862–1947)
 Charles William Tupper (1898–1960)
 (5) Charles James Tupper (b. 1942)

Notes

References
Kidd, Charles, Williamson, David (editors). Debrett's Peerage and Baronetage (1990 edition). New York: St Martin's Press, 1990, 

Tupper
Canadian baronets